Lithuanian Surfing Association is a national governing body of surfing and standup paddleboarding sports in Lithuania.

History 
Lithuanian Surfing Association was founded in 2016 at Klaipėda, Lithuania.

Organisation become a member of International Surfing Association.

References

External links 
Official website

Surfing
2016 establishments in Lithuania
Sports organizations established in 2016
Surfing organizations
Surfing in Lithuania